Gerti Pertlwieser was an Austrian slalom canoeist who competed in the late 1940s and the early 1950s. She won four medals at the ICF Canoe Slalom World Championships with three golds (Folding K-1: 1951; Folding K-1 team: 1949, 1951) and a bronze (Folding K-1: 1949).

Her granddaughter Stephanie Vock is an Austrian tennis player.

References

http://www.kanugeschichte.net/p.html

Austrian female canoeists
1925 births
1986 deaths
Medalists at the ICF Canoe Slalom World Championships